The Monthly Sathee is an Urdu children's monthly magazine based in Pakistan. It is the 40 years old Magazine or Digest of Pakistan in continuous publication since its foundation in 1977. Its current group editor is Aqib Javaid.

Special Numbers

See also

 List of Urdu magazines for children
 List of magazines in Pakistan

References

External links
 Monthly Sathee Official Website

1977 establishments in Pakistan
Children's magazines published in Pakistan
Magazines established in 1977
Mass media in Karachi
Monthly magazines published in Pakistan
Urdu-language magazines